Sallai is both a given name and a surname. Notable people with the name include:

Roland Sallai (born 1997), Hungarian footballer
Sándor Sallai (born 1960), Hungarian footballer, uncle of Roland
Sallai Meridor (born 1955), Israeli politician